Shahrak-e Isar may refer to:
 Shahrak-e Isar, Darab
 Shahrak-e Isar, Kharameh